The Karrick Block in Salt Lake City, Utah, is a 3-story, brick and stone commercial building designed by Richard K.A. Kletting and constructed in 1887. The building is Kletting's earliest work to survive in the city, and it was added to the National Register of Historic Places in 1976. Architectural historian Allan D. Roberts described the building as "essentially a Victorian work."

During construction the Karrick Block was known as Karrick's White Elephant, a name borrowed from the adjacent White Elephant Saloon, when it was discovered that the saloon overlapped Karrick's property by several inches. Roberts & Nelden pharmacy was an early tenant of the building, and the building housed eight prostitutes.

Lewis C. Karrick owned mining and mercantile interests, and he served on the city council in the 1880s. After he lost his fortune to bad investments, his wife, Sarah (Ellerbeck) Karrick, filed for divorce in 1904. Karrick died of a self inflicted gunshot wound in 1905. His son, Lewis C. Karrick, Jr., became a petroleum engineer who developed a mineral extraction technique known as the Karrick process.

The Karrick Block was covered in a Utah State information form of 1979.

References

External links

Further reading
 John S. McCormick, The Historic Buildings of Downtown Salt Lake City (Utah State Historical Society, 1982), pp 88-89 (96-97)

		
National Register of Historic Places in Salt Lake City
Early Commercial architecture in the United States
Victorian architecture in the United States
Buildings and structures completed in 1887